The 2012 Badminton Asia Championships was the 31st tournament of the Badminton Asia Championships. It was held in Qingdao, China from April 17 to April 22, 2012.

Medalists

Final Results

Men's singles

Women's singles

Men's doubles

Women's doubles

Mixed doubles

Medal table

External links
Badminton Asia Championships 2012 at tournamentsoftware.com

Badminton Asia Championships
Asian Badminton Championships
2012 Asia Championships
Badminton Asia Championships
International sports competitions hosted by China
Sport in Qingdao